Winfield Scott Withrow (September 28, 1855 – February 7, 1930) was a justice of the Iowa Supreme Court from April 19, 1913, to December 31, 1914, appointed from Henry County.

Biography
Winfield S. Withrow was born in Salem, Iowa on September 28, 1855. He earned a law degree at the State University of Iowa in 1880. A Republican, he served one term in the Iowa House of Representatives. He was a district court judge, and was appointed to the state Supreme Court on April 19, 1913.

He was a longtime trustee of Iowa Wesleyan University.

He died in Mount Pleasant on February 7, 1930.

References

External links

1855 births
1930 deaths
Justices of the Iowa Supreme Court
Members of the Iowa House of Representatives
People from Henry County, Iowa